Max Gordon Oidtmann (born 1979) is an American historian of Late Imperial China (1368–1912) and Inner Asia (Islamic Central Asia, Tibet, Mongolia, and Manchuria). He also has interest in modern China and the affairs of Chinese ethnic minorities. He was an assistant professor at Georgetown University in Qatar from 2013 to 2021. Oidtmann is currently a faculty member at the Institute for Sinology at Ludwig Maximilian University of Munich in Germany.

Education 
He earned a B.A. in History (with concentration in East Asian Studies) at Carleton College in 2001 and a M.A. degree in East Asian Regional Studies at Harvard University. In March 2014, Oidtmann received his Ph.D. in History and East Asian Languages from Harvard University.

Academic position 
He previously taught Asian History as well as specialized courses on the History of China, Islam and Muslims in East Asia, Tibet, and comparative studies of empire and colonialism at Georgetown University's School of Foreign Service campus in Doha, Qatar, from 2013 to 2021.

Fields of research 
Max Oidtmann works with historical materials in Chinese, Tibetan, Uyghur, Manchu and Japanese languages.

Oidtmann's book Forging the Golden Urn: Qing Empire and the Politics of Reincarnation in Tibet, 1792-1911 (2018) is a political history of reincarnation in China and Tibet from the late 1700s through the present.

Publication list 

Ph.D thesis
Between Patron and Priest: Amdo Tibet Under Qing Rule, 1792-1911, Harvard University, 2014, ProQuest (Abstract)

Peer-reviewed articles
 Qing Colonial Legal Culture in Amdo Tibet (original title: A Document from the Xunhua Archives,  International Society for Chinese Law & History — 中國法律与歷史國際學會, vol. 1, No 1, November 2014
 Imperial Legacies and Revolutionary Legends: The Sibe Cavalry Company, the Eastern Turkestan Republic, and Historical Memories in Xinjiang, Saksaha: A Journal of Manchu Studies, vol. 21, 2014, pp. 49–87
 A “Dog-eat-dog” World: Qing Jurispractices and the Legal Inscription of Piety in Amdo, Extrême-Orient Extrême-Occident, Issue 40, 2016, pp. 151–182, 
 Overlapping Empires: Religion, Politics, and Ethnicity in Nineteenth-Century Qinghai, Late Imperial China, Volume 37, Number 2, December 2016, pp. 41–91

 Book chapters
 (With Yang Hongwei), A Study of Qing Dynasty "Xiejia" Rest Houses in Xunhua Subprefecture, Gansu, in Muslims in Amdo Tibetan Society: Multidisciplinary Approaches, Marie-Paule Hille, Bianca Horlemann, Paul K. Nietupski, eds., Lexington Books, 2015, 354 p., pp. 21–46
 A Case for Gelukpa Governance: The Historians of Labrang, Amdo, and the Manchu Rulers of China, in Greater Tibet. An Examination of Borders, Ethnic Boundaries, and Cultural Areas, P. Christiaan Klieger ed., Rowman & Littlefield, 2015, 178 p., pp. 111–148

 Books
 Forging the Golden Urn: The Qing Empire and the Politics of Reincarnation in Tibet, Columbia University Press, 2018, 352 p.   (WEAI Author Q&A: Max Oidtmann's "Forging the Golden Urn", by Ross Yelsey, August 6, 2018)

 Reviews
 Review of The Prophet and the Party: Shari’a and Sectarianism in China’s Little Mecca, by Matthew Erie, Dissertation Reviews, October 7, 2014

Reviews of the author's contributions 
 Review by Wesley Chaney (History Department, Stanford University) of Between Patron and Priest: Amdo Tibet Under Qing Rule, In Dissertation Reviews ("Between Patron and Priest is both an encyclopedic treasure trove of information and an important intervention into scholarly debates in a range of fields — Tibetan history, Qing history, colonial studies, and legal pluralism. Through his use of a range of sources in several different languages, Oidtmann brings a completely new level of depth and detail to discussions of the Tibetan-Qing encounter.")
In an interview published on the China Study Journal website, American tibetologist Robert Barnett claims that "we know vastly more about Tibetan areas during the Qing and Republican periods because of work by Hsiao Ting Lin, Max Oidtmann, Bill Coleman, Scott Relyea and other China scholars."

References

Related 

Living people
Georgetown University faculty
Carleton College alumni
Indiana University alumni
Harvard University alumni
Tibetologists
American sinologists
Historians of China
21st-century American historians
21st-century American male writers
Place of birth missing (living people)
1979 births
American male non-fiction writers